Richard Snyder may refer to:

Rick Snyder (born 1958), American business executive, venture capitalist and Governor of Michigan
Richard C. Snyder (1916–1997), American political scientist
Richard A. Snyder (1910–1978), Republican member of the Pennsylvania State Senate
Richard E. Snyder (born 1933), American publishing executive
Richard Edward Snyder (1919–2012), US State Dept official
Richard T. Snyder, namesake of the USCGC Richard Snyder (WPC-1127)
Dick Snyder (born 1944), American former basketball player
Charles R. Snyder, Charles Richard "Rick" Snyder (1944–2006), American psychologist
USCGC Richard Snyder (WPC-1127), a Coast Guard cutter